The Waingaro River is a river of the Tasman Region of New Zealand's South Island.

Waingaro River initially flows east down a straight valley formed by the southern flanks of Snowdon Range and the northern flanks of Lockett Range within Kahurangi National Park. The headwater is near the  Waingaro Peak within the Lockett Range, accessible via a tramping track from Fenella Hut. Shortly upstream of the confluence with the Stanley River, the only bridge over the Waingaro River is located. This simple suspension bridge gives access for trampers to Waingaro Forks Hut.

Downstream from here, the Waingaro River turns to flow generally north close to the eastern edge of Kahurangi National Park. Once it reaches the Takaka Plains it flows northeast to reach the Tākaka River eight kilometres south of Tākaka, just downstream where State Highway 60 crosses the Tākaka River.

The Waingaro River caused flooding on the Takaka Plains in Easter 2016 and in January 2017.

Legal action was taken in 2016 over Waingaro River irrigation consents amid concerns that this may adversely affect the nearby Te Waikoropupū Springs. Whilst the springs themselves are protected, the acquifer feeding the system is not. In April 2018, a Water Conservation Order hearing for the springs was held. As of November 2019, no decision had been released.

There are three rivers on the Takaka Plains and during times of early colonial settlement, drownings were common as no bridges had been built yet. During that time, a common greeting was "how is the river?" This is the title chosen for a book on Tākaka history published in 2017.

See also
List of rivers of New Zealand

References

Rivers of the Tasman District
Rivers of New Zealand